Symphyotrichum estesii is a species of flowering plant in the family Asteraceae, endemic to Coffee County, Tennessee. Commonly called May Prairie aster and Estes's aster, it is a perennial, herbaceous plant that may reach  in height. Its flowers have white ray florets and yellow disk florets. It is named in honor of botanist Dwayne Estes who discovered it in 2008.

Description
Symphyotrichum estesii is a perennial plant that blooms August through November. It grows from a long rhizome and forms colonies. Its firm, hairy, green leaves range from lengths  at the base to much shorter  on the higher stems. It has sometimes up to  flower heads with yellow centers. Each head has approximately 9to17 ray florets surrounding  disk florets.

Chromosomes
Symphyotrichum estesii has a base number of x=5 with an octaploid count of40 determined by using meiosis from multiple pollen mother cells.

Taxonomy
Symphyotrichum estesii is classified in the subgenus Virgulus, section Grandiflori. It is named in honor of Austin Peay State University professor of biology and herbarium director Dwayne Estes who discovered it in 2008.

Distribution and habitat
Symphyotrichum estesii is found only in the May Prairie State Natural Area of Coffee County, Tennessee, within an area of less than 5hectares (less than approximately 12acres). May Prairie is located in the Eastern Highland Rim of central Tennessee.

Within May Prairie are an open grassland little bluestem community and a tallgrass prairie community, as well as some sedge meadows. This combined grassland community is surrounded by an oak forest that begins the oak barrens. The Symphyotrichum estesii population thrives in the hydroxeric soils in the open and sunny flat prairie sites. In semi-shaded areas nearer the woods, it can rarely be found.

Conservation
NatureServe lists it as Critically Imperiled (G1) worldwide.

Citations

References

estesii
Endemic flora of the United States
Flora of Tennessee
Plants described in 2019
Taxa named by John Cameron Semple